Oberdan Cattani (June 12, 1919 – June 20, 2014) was a Brazilian football player in the position of goalkeeper. He played for Palmeiras from 1940 to 1954.
He was born in Sorocaba, São Paulo.

Biography
Oberdan Cattani was the son of Italian immigrants from the Tuscany region. He was a truck driver when he took his first test, on a day off from work. Introduced before by his brother, he was hired in 1941, remaining at the club until 1954, having played 351 matches with Palmeiras. 

Of tall stature, big hands and elasticity, his defenses made him one of the most famous Brazilian goalkeepers of the 40s, a period in which the Second World War prevented the holding of the World Cups.

His name is among the biggest idols of Palmeiras. In his curriculum for the club, there are four titles of Campeonato Paulista (1942, 1944, 1947 and 1950), the Tournament Rio-São Paulo of 1951 and the Copa Rio Internacional of 1951. The tournament, which was created with the aim of being a Club World Cup. In the conquest, Oberdan was in the reserve of the goalkeeper Fábio Crippa. 

On April 24, 1955, Oberdan was honored in São Carlos by the "Association of Sports Chroniclers of São Carlos", with a cup.

Style of play
Oberdan was described by opponents as an agile goalkeeper with great physical strength. A hallmark of Oberdan was that he could hold the ball with just one hand.

Death
Oberdan passed away on June 20, 2014 at the age of 95. The cause of death was cardiac complications caused by pneumonia.

Titles 

 Palmeiras
 Copa Rio Internacional: 1951
 Torneio Rio-São Paulo: 1951
 Taça dos Campeões Estaduais Rio–São Paulo: 1942, 1947
 Campeonato Paulista: 1942, 1944], 1947, 1950
 Taça Cidade de São Paulo: 1945, 1946, 1950, 1951
 Torneio Início Paulista: 1942, 1946

 Seleção Paulista
 Campeonato Brasileiro de Seleções Estaduais: 1941, 1942

References

External links
Profile at Palestrinos.com.br

1919 births
2014 deaths
People from Sorocaba
Brazilian people of Italian descent
Brazilian footballers
Association football goalkeepers
Sociedade Esportiva Palmeiras players
Footballers from São Paulo (state)